Michael Whaley is an American film and television actor. He graduated from Culver City High School in 1980. Some of his most known characters are Dr. Wesley 'Wes' Hayes on Sisters, Det. Nathan Brubaker on Profiler, Detective Paul Armstrong on Early Edition, Bulldog's producer Pete on Frasier, and Detective Paul Bernstein on CSI: Miami.

Career

Actor

Movies
Class Act (1992)
Separate Lives (1995)
Retiring Tatiana (2000)
Fair Game (2005)
The Santa Clause 2 (2002)
Hoodlum & Son (2003)
The Ant Bully (2006)
Dude, I'm Moving Out (2009)
11:11 (2010)

Television movies
Running Against Time (1990)
Under Cover (1991)
Boy Meets Girl (1993)
Twice Upon a Time (1998)
The Poseidon Adventure (2005)
McBride: Semper Fi (2007)

Television
A Different World (1989, 1 Episode)
Midnight Caller (1990, 2 Episodes)
Hunter (1990, 1 Episode)
Gabriel's Fire (1991, 1 Episode)
L.A. Law (1991, 1 Episode)
I'll Fly Away (1992, 1 Episode)
Grapevine (1992, 1 Episode)
The Fresh Prince of Bel-Air (1992, 1 Episode)
Living Single (1994, 1 Episode)
Beverly Hills, 90210 (1995, 1 Episode)
Sisters (1995–1996, 7 Episodes)
Frasier (1995–1996, 2 Episodes)
Profiler (1996–1997, 22 Episodes)
Party of Five (1997, 1 Episode)
Hangin' with Mr. Cooper (1997, 1 Episode)
Vengeance Unlimited (1998, 1 Episode)
ER (1998, 1 Episode)
Any Day Now (1998, 2001, 2 Episodes)
Sons of Thunder (1999, 1 Episode)
Early Edition (1999–2000, 6 Episodes)
JAG (2001, 2 Episodes)
CSI: Miami (2002–2003, 7 Episodes)
NCIS (2007, 1 Episode)
House M.D. (2007, 1 Episode)
The Philanthropist (2009, 1 Episode)
The Event (2010, 2 Episodes)
The Mentalist (2012, 1 Episode)
American Horror Story: Roanoke (2016, 1 Episode)
Criminal Minds (2017, 1 Episode)
Scandal (2018, 1 Episode)
9-1-1 (2019, 2 Episodes)
Two Degrees (2020, 1 Episode)

Directing
Fair Game (2006)
Peaches (2008)
Applause for Miss E (2009)

Producer
Fair Game (2006)
Peaches (2008)
Applause for Miss E (2009)

Writer
Homicide: Life on the Street (1996, 1 Episode) (Teleplay and Story)
Fair Game (2005)

References

External links

Year of birth missing (living people)
Living people
20th-century American male actors
21st-century American male actors
American male film actors
American male television actors
Male actors from Long Beach, California
Yale School of Drama alumni